The 2005–06 Ohio Bobcats men's basketball team represented Ohio University in the college basketball season of 2005–06. The team was coached by Tim O'Shea and played their home games at the Convocation Center. They finished the season 19–11 and 10–9 in MAC play to finish fourth in the MAC East.

Roster

Coaching staff

Preseason
The preseason poll was announced by the league office on October 26, 2005.  Ohio was picked first in the MAC East.

Preseason men's basketball poll
(First place votes in parenthesis)

East Division
 Ohio (16) 153
  (6) 120
  (4) 85
  85
  79
  45

West Division
  (15) 135
  (5) 127
  (5) 114
  (1) 97
 Eastern Michigan 54
  40

Tournament champs
Ohio (14), Akron (5), Ball State (4), Miami (2), Toledo (1)

Preseason All-MAC 

Source

Schedule and results
Source: 

|-
!colspan=9 style=| Regular Season

|-
|-
|-
|-
|-
|-
|-
|-
|-
|-
|-
|-
|-
|-
|-
|-
|-
|-
|-
|-
|-
|-
|-
|-
|-
|-
|-
!colspan=9 style=| MAC Tournament
|-
|-
|-
|-

Statistics

Team Statistics
Final 2005–06 Statistics

Source

Player statistics

Source

References

Ohio Bobcats men's basketball seasons
Ohio
Bob
Bob